Paidi or Páidí may refer to the following:

People 
 Paidi is an Indian surname. People with the surnames or family names of Paidi or Pydi are found in the Indian states of Andhra Pradesh and Telangana. People with Paidi surname are Kalinga's who belong to Kshatriya varna of Hindu society. Majority of the People with this surname are residents of Srikakulam, Vizianagaram and Visakhapatnam Districts of Indian State of Andhra Pradesh.
 Paidi Jairaj was a legendary film actor, director and producer and winner of Dada Saheb Palke Award.
 Paidi Lakshmayya was Indian Parliamentarian, writer and administrator
 Páidí is an Irish given name.
 Paídi O'Brien, professional cyclist
 Páidí Ó Sé (1955–2012), Gaelic football player and manager

Music instruments
 Paidi (instrument)

Indian surnames